Johanne Abeyratne Samarasekera (born 22 February 1968) is a former Sri Lankan-born cricketer who played for the United Arab Emirates national cricket team. After playing twelve first-class games for his native Colombo in 1988–89 to 1989, Samarasekera emigrated to the United Arab Emirates. He made the national side for the 1994 Pepsi Austral-Asia Cup in Sharjah, where he played in his first two One Day Internationals, and he also competed for the UAE in the 1994 ICC Trophy, where he was named best bowler of the tournament, having taken 18 wickets. After playing in the 1995–96 Interface Cup, a List A competition also involving A sides from India, Pakistan and Sri Lanka, he was selected for the UAE in the 1996 World Cup. Samarasekera fared poorly in that competition and was not selected for the national side again.

He played 7 ODIs for the UAE and scored 124 runs at an average of 31.00; his highest score was 47. He also bagged 4 wickets for 236 runs with a best bowling of 1/17 and economy rate of 4.82

External links

1968 births
Living people
Sri Lankan cricketers
Emirati cricketers
Colombo Cricket Club cricketers
United Arab Emirates One Day International cricketers
Cricketers from Colombo
Sri Lankan emigrants to the United Arab Emirates
Sri Lankan expatriate sportspeople in the United Arab Emirates